Dil-e-Beqarar (lit:The Quiet Heart), is a Pakistani romantic television drama serial that was first aired on Hum TV on 13 April 2016 replacing Maana Ka Gharana. It airs every Wednesday at 7:00 pm PST. It stars Junaid Khan, Mansha Pasha and Hareem Farooq.

Plot 
The story is about two brothers, Javed and Abbas (Qazi Wajid) who are fighted with their money. They both even not like their faces after an incident. Javed marries with Aasiya and Awaz marries with Salma (Birjees Farooqui). Javed has a son Sohail (Ahsan Balaj) and a daughter, Farida (Hareem Farooq). While, Abbas has a son, Mudasir (Junaid Khan). Both Farida and Mudasir fell in love but their parents forbid them to marry because of their fight. Sohail marries Shehla. Aasiya and Javed decide to marry Farida with Naveed, Shehla's relative/cousin. Farida refuses a proposal but they try. Abbas' hate for his brother has made him hate also with Farida and Sohail as well. They both court marriage each other. After 7 years of leap, Mudasir's parents die naturally and Aasiya as well. Farida's father Javed survives but is ill and dies later in Farida's memories. Mudasir works in a job of Haji Sahab. Haji Sahab's daughter Sara (Mansha Pasha) was married to her fiancé Shehriyar, but was divorced due to Shehriyar's flud. She was then married to a cruel man, Jibran who divorced her later. Haji Sahab asked Mudasir to marry Sara which he agrees after asking Farida, and Farida agrees under the hope that they will get more money for her new house. He doesn't know that Sara was married to her fiancé. They (Shehriyar and Sara) meet in restaurant while Farida is with her and the kids, Sara acts as she doesn't know him in front of Farida. Farida asks same man how he know Sara later on, and tells him she's Sara's best friend and he tells her that he was Sara's first husband and lover and says he couldn't stay married with a woman who couldn't have children and secretly married to another lady and then Sara and Sheryar got divorced. Shehryar teases and often tries to meet up with Sara. He demands huge amounts of money in return for the promise of not exposing his relation with Sara in front of Mudassir. Mudassir suspects Sara and in the end reveals to Sara that he knew of Shehryar. Sara and Mudassir reconcile but Farida is left out.

Cast 
 Hareem Farooq as Farida Javed
 Junaid Khan as Mudasir Abbas
 Mansha Pasha as Sara Haji
 Jahanara Hai as Sajida
 Ahsan Balaj as Sohail Javed
 Marium Effendi as Shehla (young)
 Arjumand Hussain as Haji Sahab (Sara's father)
 Muhammad Hanif as Javed (Farida's father)
 Sabiha Hashmi
 Birjees Farooqui as Salma Abbas (Mudasir's mother)
 Qazi Wajid as Abbas (Mudasir's father)
 Umar Sultan
  Shan

Child stars 
 Hammad Khan as Sunny (Mudasir & Farida's son)
 Neha as Areesha (Mudasir & Farida's daughter)

See also 
 List of programs broadcast by Hum TV
 2016 in Pakistani television

References

External links 
 Hum TV
 Dil E Beqarar

Hum TV
Hum Network Limited
Hum TV original programming
Urdu-language television shows
Pakistani drama television series
2016 Pakistani television series debuts
2016 Pakistani television series endings